is an athlete from Japan, who competes in archery.

He placed 42nd at the 2000 Summer Olympics.

At the 2004 Summer Olympics he was again defeated in the first round of elimination, placing 37th overall in men's individual archery. Later he was a member of the 8th-place Japanese men's archery team.

External links
Olympic athlete biographies - Yuji HAMANO, Archery JPN
2004Japan Olympic Committee

1980 births
Living people
Japanese male archers
Olympic archers of Japan
Archers at the 2000 Summer Olympics
Archers at the 2004 Summer Olympics
Asian Games medalists in archery
Archers at the 2002 Asian Games
Asian Games silver medalists for Japan
Medalists at the 2002 Asian Games